Bharthaavudyogam is a 2001 Indian Malayalam comedy drama film, directed by Suresh Vinu, starring Jagadish and Jagathy Sreekumar in the lead roles. The film had musical score compossed by M Jayachandran.

Cast
 Jagadish as Unnikrishnan Namboothiri
 Kalabhavan Mani as B.B.C Ramji	
 Cochin Haneefa as ASI Minnal Prathapan	
 Siddique as Reji Menon
 Athira as Uma Devi Antharjanam, Unnikrishnan's wife
 Devi Chandana	
 Indrans as Madhavan/Unnikrishnan's friend	
Jagathy Sreekumar as Mathachan
 Kozhikode Narayanan Nair	
 Ponnamma Babu as Sulochana, Minnal Prathapan's wife	
 Salim Kumar as Pushpan
Bindu Panikkar as Mohini, Pushpan's wife	
 Suma Jayaram as Stella
Paravoor Bharathan as Kaimal
Machan Varghese as Varkkey

Soundtrack
"Kanikaanum Thaaram" - written by S. Rameshan Nair, performed by M.G. Sreekumar and Sujatha Mohan
"Poomakale Poothinkale" - G. Venugopal

References

External links

2001 films
2000s Malayalam-language films
Films scored by M. Jayachandran